Ali Maloumat (born 22 November 1981, Chenaran) is an Iranian judoka.

He competed for Iran at the following tournaments:
2007 German Open, Braunschweig, 7th
Kurash at the 2007 Asian Indoor Games, Gold Medal
2007 Asian Judo Championships, 5th place 
2008 Summer Olympics, 5th place
2008 Asian Judo Championships, Gold Medal
2009 World Judo Championships, Rotterdam
2010 World Judo Championships, 1st round
2010 Asian Games, Preliminary
2011 Asian Judo Championships, Bronze Medal
2011 World Judo Championships, 2nd round
2011 Grand Slam, Brazil
2011 World Cup, Baku
2012 World Cup, Prague

References

External links
 
 
 

Living people
Sportspeople from Mashhad
Iranian male judoka
Judoka at the 2008 Summer Olympics
Olympic judoka of Iran
1981 births
Judoka at the 2010 Asian Games
Asian Games competitors for Iran
21st-century Iranian people